David Wike (born April 20, 1969) is an American film and stage actor, writer, director.

Career

Film writing and directing
Out There is a 2008 comedy film written and directed by David Wike. It stars Kevin Corrigan, Clea DuVall, Ebon Moss-Bachrach, Xander Berkeley, Margo Martindale and Wike. Out There premiered at the SXSW Film Festival. Wike was screenwriter for the film An Evening with Beverly Luff Linn, released in 2018.

Stage
Wike played the role of "Joey" in the original production of The Dog Problem by David Rabe. It premiered at the Atlantic Theater Company in New York City.

Film

References

External links
 
 Out There Official Site
 Sundance

American male film actors
American male stage actors
American male television actors
Living people
Male actors from Philadelphia
Writers from Philadelphia
1969 births